The Robert Schuman Foundation is a Christian Democratic think tank affiliated with the European People's Party group in the European Parliament, and named in honour of statesman Robert Schuman. Its president is Jacques Santer. It is affiliated to the Centre for European Studies, the official foundation/think tank of the European People's Party.

The foundation was established in 1989 in Luxembourg by Christian Democratic MEPs Egon Klepsch, Horst Langes, Andrea Bonetti, Conçeptio Ferrer, Johanna Maij-Weggen, Nicolas Estgen, and Françisco Lucas Pires. Its purpose was to support democracy in Central and Eastern Europe, Latin America, and Africa.

It should not be confused with the French Robert Schuman Foundation (established in 1991), or the  Robert Schuman Institute based in Budapest, Hungary.

References

External links
Official site

European People's Party
Organizations established in 1989